Rui de Carvalho de Araújo Moreira (born 8 August 1956) is a Portuguese businessman and politician, currently serving as Mayor of Porto since 2013.  While officially an independent, he has been supported by the CDS – People's Party since 2013 and the Liberal Initiative since 2021.

Biography
Moreira was born in Porto. One of his great-grandfathers was Adolfo Höfle, a wealthy German migrant and employer of João Augusto Ferreira de Almeida, the last man executed by Portugal in 1917. Moreira graduated in Business from London's University of Greenwich, top of his 1978 class. A competitive sailor, he won youth and senior titles and represented Portugal in the sport.

From 2004, Moreira represented FC Porto on Trio d'Ataque, an RTP programme with pundits from the Big Three of Portuguese football. He was dismissed from the show in October 2010, after walking off stage during a discussion about the Apito Dourado corruption scandal at his club.

In September 2013, running as an independent allied to the CDS – People's Party, he was elected mayor of Porto. He was re-elected four years later, with an absolute majority. In 2021, his list now including the Liberal Initiative won the elections but lost its majority, having six of 13 councillors.

Honours
 Grand-Cross of the Order of Civil Merit, Spain (28 November 2016)

References

External links
Official Porto profile

Mayors of Porto
Living people
1956 births
People from Porto
Portuguese male sailors (sport)
Alumni of the University of Greenwich
Portuguese people of German descent